The  is an electric multiple unit (EMU) train type operated by Kita-Osaka Kyuko Railway on the Kitakyu Namboku Line in north Osaka since 1986, with through service to the Osaka Municipal Subway Midōsuji Line.

Design
This EMU was introduced in 1986 to replace ageing rolling stock which were mostly developed from Osaka Municipal Subway rolling stock. It was also one of the three recipients of the 27th Laurel Prize of the Japan Railfan Club.

Formation
, five out of the original seven 10-car sets were in service, formed as shown below, with five motored ("M") cars and five non-powered trailer ("T") cars, and car 1 at the Senri-Chuo end.

Each car includes a wheelchair space.

History
The first train, set 8001, was introduced on 1 July 1986.

Withdrawals commenced in 2014, with 8002 in August 2014, and set 8004 in February 2015. Set 8001 carried a special headboard from late February 2016 to mark its scheduled withdrawn in March 2016.

Preserved examples
 8001 + 8901 cab end: Momoyamadai Depot, Osaka
 8005: Privately preserved in Tamba-Sasayama, Hyōgo.

References

Electric multiple units of Japan
Train-related introductions in 1986
750 V DC multiple units
Alna Koki rolling stock